Monterosso or Monte Rosso means Red Mountain in Italian and may refer to:

Places

Italy
Monterosso al Mare, a municipality in the Province of La Spezia, Liguria
Monterosso Almo, a municipality in the Province of Ragusa, Sicily
Monterosso Calabro, a municipality in the Province of Vibo Valentia, Calabria
Monterosso Grana, a municipality in the Province of Cuneo, Piedmont
Monterosso, a hamlet of Abano Terme and Teolo, Province of Padua, Veneto
Monte Rosso or Roteck, a mountain of South Tyrol
Monte Rosso (Colli Euganei), a mountain of the Veneto

People with the surname
Francesco Monterosso (born 1991), Australian football (soccer) player

Other uses
Monterosso (horse), British-bred Thoroughbred racehorse